Builders Square was a big-box home improvement retailer headquartered in San Antonio, Texas. In 1997, a Los Angeles leveraged buyout specialist acquired Builders Square and merged it with Hechinger but the new combined company failed to thrive and all remaining stores ceased business operations by the end of 1999.

Home Decor Products revived the Builders Square brand name in the mid-2000s as builderssquare.com, a comparison shopping website for home and garden products. It was headquartered in Edison, New Jersey. The website was abandoned in 2009.

History

Beginnings
The company was founded in February 1983 as Home Centers of America by Frank Denny, an executive who had recently been president of the home center subsidiary of W. R. Grace and Company. Somewhat unusually for the time, Home Centers of America was funded from the beginning as a public stock company.  The company opened its first store in San Antonio soon after and eventually operated nine stores, all in Texas, and all operating as Home Pro Warehouse.  Home Centers of America was sold to Kmart in July 1984 for $88.2 million (USD). The company and all stores were renamed Builders Square after acquisition, with Denny continuing as Builders Square company president for several years and overseeing company expansion.

During the 1980s, Builders Square was a player in the fast-growing do-it-yourself consumer market, which included competitors National Lumber, Home Depot, HomeClub, Builders Emporium, Ole's, Angels, and others.

By 1997, the chain operated 162 stores in Alabama, California, Colorado, Connecticut, Florida, Illinois, Indiana, Kansas, Kentucky, Massachusetts, Michigan, Minnesota, Missouri, New Hampshire, New Jersey, New Mexico, New York, Nevada, North Carolina, North Dakota, Ohio, Oklahoma, Oregon, Pennsylvania, Rhode Island, South Dakota, Texas, Virginia, Wisconsin, and Puerto Rico. However, despite a $700 million investment by its parent company, high-profile sponsorships that included the Alamo Bowl, and celebrity spokespeople such as Al Michaels, Darrell Waltrip and Tim Allen, the chain was not able to maintain profitability.

Hechinger and bankruptcy

In 1997, Kmart and Leonard Green & Partners agreed to merge Hechinger and Builders Square as the third-largest home improvement retail chain in the United States. Store closures were underway in early 1999; for example, in February the company announced the closure of 16 stores in the Chicago area. Hechinger filed for Chapter 11 bankruptcy reorganization in June 1999.  The reorganization effort resulted in closure of a large number of stores and the sale of others to The Home Depot.  All remaining Builders Square stores were converted to the Home Quarters brand.  However, the reorganization plan was not successful and Hechinger filed for Chapter 7 liquidation in September 1999.  The six locations in Puerto Rico were bought out by Empresas Masso (Masso Enterprises), a local chain of home improvement stores, which in turn sold the stores to The Home Depot in 2000.

Return
Builders Square re-emerged in 2006 as an online shopping comparison site focused exclusively on the home and garden market after the parent company, Home Decor Products, purchased rights to the Builders Square name. Home Decor Products filed Chapter 7 bankruptcy in April 2009 and ceased operations, but former executives purchased all assets as a new virtual company, HomeClick LLC. They dropped the Builders Square brand and the now-dead builderssquare.com website.

References

Online retailers of the United States
Retail companies established in 1983
Retail companies disestablished in 1999
Retail companies established in 2006
Internet properties established in 2006
Retail companies disestablished in 2009
Companies that filed for Chapter 11 bankruptcy in 1999
Companies that have filed for Chapter 7 bankruptcy
Defunct retail companies of the United States
Re-established companies
Companies based in San Antonio
Companies based in Middlesex County, New Jersey
Edison, New Jersey
1983 establishments in Texas
2006 disestablishments in Texas
Home improvement retailers of the United States
Kmart